Zhangping may refer to:

Zhangping City (漳平), county-level city in the municipal region of Longyan, Fujian, China 
Zhangping (township) (樟坪), ethnic township in Guixi City in the municipal region of Yingtan, Jiangxi, China 
Zhang Ping (politician), Chinese politician